Iton semamora, the common wight, is a blue butterfly which is found in South and Southeast Asia, specifically, Sikkim, Myanmar and peninsular Malaysia.

References

External links
 Page on genus Iton on tolweb.org. Accessed 25 Jul 2009.

Hesperiinae
Butterflies of Asia
Butterflies described in 1866
Butterflies of Indochina
Taxa named by Frederic Moore